Edward Thomas Copson FRSE (21 August 1901 – 16 February 1980) was a British mathematician who contributed widely to the development of mathematics at the University of St Andrews, serving as Regius Professor of Mathematics amongst other positions.

Life
He was born in Coventry, and was a pupil at King Henry VIII School, Coventry. He studied at St John's College, Oxford. He was appointed by E. T. Whittaker as a lecturer at the University of Edinburgh, where he was later awarded a DSc.

He married Beatrice, the elder daughter of E. T. Whittaker, and moved to the University of St Andrews where he was  Regius Professor of Mathematics, and later Dean of Science, then Master of the United College. He was instrumental in the construction of the new Mathematics Institute building at the University.

He was elected a Fellow of the Royal Society of Edinburgh in 1924, his proposers being Sir Edmund Taylor Whittaker, Herbert Stanley Allen, Bevan Braithwaite Baker and A. Crichton Mitchell. He was awarded the Keith Medal by the Royal Society of Edinburgh in 1942 for his research in mathematics. He served as the Society's Vice President from 1950-53.

Work
Copson's primary focus was in classical analysis, asymptotic expansions, differential and integral equations, and applications to problems in theoretical physics. His first book "The theory of functions of a complex variable" was published in 1935.

Publications
Copson, E. T., An Introduction to the Theory of Functions of A Complex Variable (1935)
Baker, Bevan Braithwaite; Copson, E. T., "The Mathematical Theory of Huygens' Principle" (1939); 2nd edition 1950; 3rd edition 1987 with several reprints
Copson, E. T., Asymptotic Expansions (1965); reprint 1976; 2nd edition 2004
Copson, E. T., Metric Spaces (1968); reprint with corrections 1972; reprint 1979; pbk. reprint 1988
Copson, E. T., Partial Differential Equations (1975)

References

Alumni of St John's College, Oxford
Alumni of the University of Edinburgh
20th-century British mathematicians
People educated at King Henry VIII School, Coventry
1901 births
1980 deaths
Academics of the University of St Andrews